The Dardani or Dardanians were a Paleo-Balkan people, who lived in a region that was named Dardania after their settlement there. They were among the oldest Balkan peoples, and their society was very complex. The Dardani were the most stable and conservative ethnic element among the peoples of the central Balkans, retaining for several centuries an enduring presence in the region.

Most ancient sources classify Dardanians as Illyrians. Strabo and Appian explicitly referred to them as Illyrians. Strabo, in particular – also mentioning Galabri and Thunatae as Dardanian tribes – describes the Dardani as one of the three strongest Illyrian peoples, the other two being the Ardiaei and Autariatae. There were Thracian names in the eastern strip of Dardania but Illyrian names dominated the rest

The Kingdom of Dardania was attested since the 4th century BC in ancient sources reporting the wars the Dardanians waged against their south-eastern neighbor – Macedon – until the 2nd century BC. After the Celtic invasion of the Balkans weakened the state of the Macedonians and Paeonians, the political and military role of the Dardanians began to grow in the region. They expanded their state to the area of Paeonia which definitively disappeared from history, and to some territories of the southern Illyrians. The Dardanians strongly pressured the Macedonians, using every opportunity to attack them. However the Macedonians quickly recovered and consolidated their state, and the Dardanians lost their important political role. The strengthening of the Illyrian (Ardiaean–Labeatan) state on their western borders also contributed to the restriction of Dardanian warlike actions towards their neighbors.

Dardanians fought against Roman proconsuls, and were finally defeated probably by Marcus Antonius in 39 BC or by Marcus Licinius Crassus in 29/8 BC. They were included in the Roman province of Moesia. After the Roman emperor Domitian divided the province of Moesia into Moesia Superior and Moesia Inferior in 86 AD, the Dardani were located in southern Moesia Superior. A Roman colony was established at Scupi in Dardanian territory under the Flavian dynasty. In the 2nd century AD Dardanians were still notorious as brigants (latrones dardaniae). During the late Imperial period their territory was the homeland of many Roman emperors, notably Constantine the Great and Justinian I.

Name 

In 1854, Johann Georg von Hahn was the first to propose that the names Dardanoi and Dardania were related to the Albanian word  ("pear, pear-tree"). This is suggested by the fact that toponyms related to fruits or animals are not unknown in the region (cf. Alb.  "sheep" supposedly related to Dalmatia, Ulcinj in Montenegro < Alb.  "wolf" etc.). A common Albanian toponym with the same root is Dardha, found in various parts of Albania, including Dardha in Berat, Dardha in Korça, Dardha in Librazhd, Dardha in Puka, Dardhas in Pogradec, Dardhaj in Mirdita, and Dardhës in Përmet. Dardha in Puka is recorded as Darda in a 1671 ecclesiastical report and on a 1688 map by a Venetian cartographer. Dardha is also the name of an Albanian tribe in the northern part of the District of Dibra.

Opinions differ on the etymon of the root in Proto-Albanian, and eventually in Proto-Indo-European. On the basis of an alleged connection between Albanian dardhë and Greek  "wild pear", a common Indo-European root has been tentativelly reconstructed by scholars:  "thorn bush"; ;  "thorny, grain, barley". However it has been suggested that this connection is only conceivable assuming an ancient common Balkano-Aegean substrate word for Albanian and Greek. More recently for the Albanian dardhë the Proto-Albanian  has been reconstructed, itself a derivative of  "to tip out, pour, spill, secrete, cast (metals)" < PAlb . In Old Albanian texts the root is recorded not umlautized: . It continues Proto-Albanian , which is close to onomatopoeic Lithuanian  "to rattle" Latvian  "to creak", Welsh  "to mumble, to gumble" (the semantic development of "pear" that occurs in Albanian can also be seen in the Slavic parallel ,  "pear, pear tree" < ,  "to crumble, to break", and also in the Indo-European parallel  "pear" < ).. Slavic toponyms with "Kruševo" (from Proto-Slavic kruša, "pear") and other related toponyms have been proposed as South Slavic translations of Darda- toponyms.

The suffix -ano in Dard- was common to many Indo-European languages.

The ethnonym Pirustae, which is attested since Roman times for a tribe close to the Dardani or living in Dardania, is considered to be the Latin translation of Dardani (cf. Latin pirus "pear").

In ancient sources 
The name of the Dardani is mentioned for the first time in the Iliad in the name of Dardanus who founded Dardanus on the Aegean coast of Anatolia and his people the Dardanoi, from which the toponym Dardanelles is derived . Other parallel ethnic names in the Balkans and Anatolia, respectively include: Eneti and Enetoi, Bryges and Phryges. These parallels indicate closer links than simply a correlation of names. According to a current explanation, the connection is likely related to the large-scale movement of peoples that occurred at the end of the Bronze Age (around 1200 BC), when the attacks of the 'Sea Peoples' afflicted some of the established powers around the eastern Mediterranean.

In ancient historiography, the Dardani of the Balkans are mentioned as a people in the second century BCE by Polybius who describes their wars against Philip II of Macedon in the fourth century BC. Historians of Hellenistic and Roman antiquity who mention the Dardanians are Diodorus Siculus, Marcus Terentius Varro, Strabo, Sallust, Appian, Dionysius of Halicarnassus and others.  According to a mythological tradition reported by Appian (2nd century AD), Dardanos (Δάρδανος), one of the sons of Illyrius (Ἰλλυριός), was the eponymous ancestor of the Dardanoi (Δάρδανοι).

In the late 1st century BCE, in Rome a new ideological discourse was formed. Propagated by poets like Horace and Ovid, it constructed a glorious Trojan past for the Romans, who were claimed to be descendants of Trojan Dardanians. In the years before the Trojan origin story became the official Roman narrative about their origins, the Romans came into conflict in the Balkans with the Dardani. In public discourse this created the problem that the Roman army could be seen as fighting against a people who could be related to the ancestors of the Romans. The image of the historical Dardani in the 1st century BC was that of Illyrian barbarians who raided their Macedonian frontier and had to be dealt with. In this context, the name of a people known as the Moesi appeared in Roman sources. The Moesi are mentioned only in three ancient sources in the period after the death of Emperor Augustus in 14 CE. The name itself was taken from the name of the Mysians in Asia Minor.  The choice seems to be related to the fact that the Trojan-era Mysians lived close to the Trojan-era Dardanians. As the name of the Dardani in Roman discourse became linked to the ancestors of the Romans, the actual Dardani began to be covered in Roman literature by other names. After the death of Augustus, their name in connection to the Balkans became a political problem. After the death of Augustus, the new emperor was Tiberius, his stepson and the most senior Roman general in the Balkans. As Tiberius had played a key role in the Roman conquest of the Balkans, as emperor he couldn't be portrayed as the conqueror of Dardanians, whose name had been constructed as the name of the mythical progenitors of the Romans. Thus, the decision to create a new name for Dardania and the Dardani was made. Despite this decision and the administrative use of the names Moesia and Moesi for the Dardani and Dardania, the original use of the name persisted by authors like Appian. The name Dardania was not used for several hundred years after this period in an administrative context. It was only recreated by Emperor Diocletian in the 3rd century CE.

History

Emergence 

The territory of present-day Kosovo which formed the core area of the Dardani has been inhabited since the Neolithic era. Runik and Vlashnjë are two of the most significant sites in the Neolithic period. During the late 3rd millennium BCE, Proto-Indo-European tribes migrated and settled in the region alongside the existing Neolithic population. New practices in agriculture and cattle breeding appear in this period and new settlements formed in Kosovo. Co-existence and intermingling of the Neolithic population and the PIE-speakers gave rise to the material culture which developed in the Bronze Age (2100-1100 BCE) in settlements including Vlashnjë, Korishë, Pogragjë, Bardhi i Madh and Topanicë. In the Iron Age habitation further developed with the emergence of the Glasinac-Mat culture, an Illyrian material culture which developed in the Iron Age western Balkans. The Dardani - as they became known in classical antiquity - were one of the particular groups of the Glasinac-Mat culture. Archaeological research in the territory of Dardania greatly expanded since 2000. In contemporary research, a periodization of four phases of development of pre-Roman Dardania is being utilized:

11th-9th century BCE, a transitory period between the Bronze and the Iron Age 
8th-7th century BCE, Iron Age I phase
6th-4th century BCE, Iron Age II phase, during which contacts with the Mediterranean and imports from Greece increase 
4th-1st century BCE, Hellenistic period.

Classical antiquity 

In Dardania tribal aristocracy and pre-urban development emerged from the 6th–5th centuries BC. The contacts of the Dardanians with the Mediterranean world began early and intensified during the Iron Age. Trade connections with the Ancient Greek world were created from the 7th century BC onwards. The proto-urban development was followed by the creation of urban centers and the emergence of craftsmanship, and a Dardanian polity began to develop from the 4th century BC. Material culture and accounts in classical sources suggest that Dardanian society reached an advanced phase of development.

The Dardani are referred to as one of the opponents of Macedon in the 4th century BC, clashing with Philip II who managed to subdue them and their neighbors, probably during the early period of his reign. The Dardani have remained quiet until Philip II's death, after which they were planning defection. However an open war have not been caused by their riots, since Alexander the Great menaged to have the full control of the kingdom and its army after succeeding his father to the Macedonian throne. Indeed the Dardani have not been mentioned in the ancient accounts concerning the events of Alexander's Balkan campaign. It appears that the Dardani evaded the Macedonian rule during the Wars of the Diadochi between 284 BC and 281 BC, at the time of Lysimachus'empire. Thereafter the Dardani became a constant threat to Macedon on its northern borders.

In 279 BC, at the times of the great Celtic invasion, Dardania was raided by several Celtic tribes on their campaigns that were undertaken to plunder the treasuries of Greek temples. During these events an unnamed Dardanian king offered to help the Macedonians with 20,000 soldiers to counteract the invading Celts, but it was refused by the Macedonian king Ptolemy Keraunos who, underestimating the Celtic strength, died fighing them. Only at the oracle of Delphi the Celts eventually arrested and were defeated. Afterwards they withdrew in the north passing through Dardania, however they were completely destroyed by the Dardani. Further references to the Dardani are provided in the ancient sources describing Dardanian constant wars against Macedonians from the second half of the 3rd century BC.

After the Celtic invasion of the Balkans weakened the state of the Macedonians and Paeonians, the political and military role of the Dardanians began to grow in the region. They expanded their state to the area of Paeonia which definitively disappeared from history. In 230 the Dardani under Longarus captured Bylazora from the Paeonians. Taking advantage of Macedonian weakness, in 229 the Dardani attacked Macedonia and defeated Demetrius II in an important battle. After obtaining a great victory over the Macedonian army the Dardani invaded Macedon proper. The Dardanian expansion in Macedon, similar to the Ardiaean expansion in Epirus around the same years, may have been part of a general movement among the Illyrian peoples.

In this period Dardanian influence on the region grew and some other Illyrian tribes deserted Teuta, joining the Dardani under Longarus and forcing Teuta to call off her expedition forces in Epirus. When Philip V rose to the Macedonian throne, skirmishing with Dardani began in 220-219 BC and he managed to capture Bylazora from them in 217 BC. Skirmishes continued in 211 and in 209 when a force of Dardani under Aeropus, probably a pretender to the Macedonian throne, captured Lychnidus and looted Macedonia taking 20.000 prisoners and retreating before Philip's forces could reach them.

In 201 Bato of Dardania along with Pleuratus the Illyrian and Amynander king of Athamania, cooperated with Roman consul Sulpicius in his expedition against Philip V. Being always under the menace of Dardanian attacks on Macedonia, around 183 BC Philip V made an alliance with the Bastarnae and invited them to settle in Polog, the region of Dardania closest to Macedonia. A joint campaign of the Bastarnae and Macedonians against the Dardanians was organized, but Philip V died and his son Perseus of Macedon withdrew his forces from the campaign. The Bastarnae crossed the Danube in huge numbers and although they didn't meet the Macedonians, they continued the campaign. Some 30,000 Bastarnae under the command of Clondicus seem to have defeated the Dardani. In 179 BC, the Bastarnae conquered the Dardani, who later in 174 pushed them out, in a war which proved catastrophic, with a few years later, in 170 BC, the Macedonians defeating the Dardani. Macedonia and Illyria became Roman protectorates in 168 BC. The Scordisci, a tribe of Celtic origin, most likely subdued the Dardani in the mid-2nd century BC, after which there was no mention of the Dardani for a long time.

Roman era 

Illyria and Macedonia became Roman protectorates in 168 BC. In 97 BC, the Dardani are mentioned again, defeated by the Macedonian Roman army. In 88 BC, the Dardani invaded the Roman province of Macedonia together with the Scordisci and the Maedi.

According to Strabo's Geographica (compiled 20 BC–23 AD), they were divided into two sub-groups, the Galabri and the Thunatae.

It seems quite probable that the Dardani actually lost independence in 28 BC thus, the final occupation of Dardania by Rome has been connected with the beginnings of Augustus' rule in 6 AD, when they were finally conquered by Rome. Dardania was conquered by Gaius Scribonius Curio and the Latin language was soon adopted as the main language of the tribe as many other conquered and Romanized. After the Roman emperor Domitian divided the province of Moesia into Moesia Superior and Moesia Inferior in 86 AD, the Dardani were located in southern Moesia Superior.

At first, Dardania was not a separate Roman province, but became a region in the province of Moesia Superior in 87 AD. Emperor Diocletian later (284) made Dardania into a separate province with its capital at Naissus (Niš). During the Byzantine administration (in the 6th century), there was a Byzantine province of Dardania that included cities of Ulpiana, Scupi, Stobi, Justiniana Prima, and others.

Polity

A Dardanian polity began to develop from the 4th century BC. The Kingdom of Dardania was attested since the 4th century BC in ancient sources reporting the wars the Dardanians waged against their south-eastern neighbor – Macedon – until the 2nd century BC. The Dardanian kingdom was made up of many tribes and tribal groups, confirmed by Strabo, who mentions the Galabri and Thunatae as Dardanian tribes, and describes the Dardani as one of the three strongest Illyrian peoples, the other two being the Ardiaei and Autariatae.

The Dardanians, in all their history, always had separate domains from the rest of the Illyrians. The term was used to describe the Dardanian political status as a semi-independent country in the later Roman Republic. Little data exists about the territory of the Dardani prior to Roman conquest, especially on its southern extent which has been contested with Macedon, so scholars use information provided in Roman times to define the bounds of Dardanian territory.

An unnamed Dardanian king is mentioned in ancient sources describing the events of the region of the early 3rd century BC. He offered the Macedonian king Ptolemy Ceraunos 20,000 soldiers to counteract the invading Celts, but Ceraunos declined the offer. Tribal chiefs Longarus and his son Bato took part in the wars against Romans and Macedonians.

Culture
Graves from the 6th and 5th centuries BCE in Romajë contain long iron bars which were placed in the tombs are a means of payment to the afterlife. They indicate that the tribe of the Dardani had developed a concept about the afterlife as shown later in other archaeological material like the votive monument of Smirë. The weapons included double-edged axes (Labrys), which might have been used in a ritualistic manner related to sun worship which was prevalent in the northern Illyrian tribes 

Unlike their Thracian neighbors, in pre-Roman times the Dardani were not Hellenized.

According to Ancient Greek and Roman historiography, the tribe was viewed of as "extremely barbaric". Claudius Aelianus and other writers wrote that they bathed only three times in their lives. At birth, when they were wed and after they died. Strabo refers to them as wild and dwelling in dirty caves under dung-hills. This however may have had to do not with cleanliness, as bathing had to do with monetary status from the viewpoint of the Greeks. At the same time, Strabo writes that they had some interest in music as they owned and used flutes and corded instruments.

Dardanian slaves or freedmen at the time of the Roman conquest were clearly of Paleo-Balkan origin, according to their personal names. It has been noted that personal names were mostly of the "Central-Dalmatian type".

Language 
An extensive study based on onomastics has been undertaken by Radoslav Katičić which puts the Dardani language area in the Central Illyrian area ("Central Illyrian" consisting of most of former Yugoslavia, north of southern Montenegro to the west of Morava, excepting ancient Liburnia in the northwest, but perhaps extending into Pannonia in the north).

The eastern parts of the region were at the Thraco-Illyrian contact zone. In archaeological research, Illyrian names are predominant in western Dardania (present-day Kosovo), and occasionally appear in eastern Dardania (present-day south-eastern Serbia), while Thracian names are found in the eastern parts, but are absent from the western parts. Thus, their identification as either an Illyrian or Thracian tribe has been a subject of debate; the ethnolinguistic relationship between the two groups being largely uncertain and debated itself as well. The correspondence of Illyrian names, including those of the ruling elite, in Dardania with those of the southern Illyrians suggests a "thracianization" of parts of Dardania.

Dardanian rulers 
Unnamed Dardanian king (early 3rd century BC), who offered the Macedonian king Ptolemy Ceraunos 20,000 soldiers to counteract the invading Celts, but Ceraunos declined the offer.
Longarus;
Bato
Monunius II

Some scholars believe that Illyrian rulers Bardylis, Audata, Cleitus (son of Bardylis), Bardylis II, Bircenna (daughter of Bardylis II), and Monunios were Dardanian, however this is considered an old fallacy because it is unsupported by any ancient source, while some facts and ancient geographical locations go squarely against it.

See also 

List of ancient Illyrian peoples and tribes
List of ancient tribes in Illyria
Illyrians
Thracians

Notes

References

Bibliography 

 
Illyrian tribes
Thracian tribes
Thraco-Illyrian
Indo-European peoples
Ancient tribes in Macedonia
Ancient tribes in North Macedonia
Ancient tribes in Kosovo
Moesia
Ancient tribes in Serbia
Tribes conquered by Rome
Tribes conquered by the Roman Republic

bg:Дардания (провинция)
bs:Dardanija
de:Dardanien
es:Dardanios
hr:Dardanija
sq:Dardania
sv:Dardanien